The Ziz is a giant griffin-like bird in Jewish mythology, said to be large enough to be able to block out the sun with its wingspan.

Description 
It is considered a giant animal/monster corresponding to archetypal creatures. Rabbis have said that the Ziz is comparable to the Persian Simurgh, while modern scholars compare the Ziz to the Sumerian Anzû and the Ancient Greek phoenix.

There is only passing mention of the Ziz in the Bible, found in  "I know all the birds of the mountains and Zīz śādeh is mine" and  "The boar from the forest ravages it, and Zīz śādeh  feeds on it", and these are often lost in translation from the Hebrew, being referred to in most English translations as ambiguous "beasts" and referred to as neither singular nor avian.  The Jewish aggadot say of the Ziz:

Non-Jews also knew of the Ziz. Johannes Buxtorf's 1603 Synagoga Judaica discusses the Ziz.  His text is echoed in English by Samuel Purchas in 1613:

Humphrey Prideaux in 1698 describes the Ziz as being like a giant celestial rooster:

See also 
 
Bar Juchne
Golem
Behemoth
Cherub
Leviathan
Melek Taus
Garuda
Minokawa
Roc

References 

Legendary birds
Jewish legendary creatures
Animals in Judaism